= Alloy 601 =

Nickel and chromium alloy

Alloy 601 is a nickel alloy, mostly made up of nickel and chromium, with small amounts of aluminium, silicon, copper and manganese. This creates a number of desirable properties including good high temperature strength, corrosion resistance under oxidizing conditions and it retains ductility after long service exposure. It is often used in various types of engineering equipment which require heat resistance and corrosion resistance.

== Composition ==
%	Nickel (Ni)	Chromium (Cr)	Copper (Cu)	Carbon (C)	Manganese (Mn)	Silicon (Si)	Sulfur (S)	Iron (Fe)	Aluminium (Al)
Min	58	21	0	0	0	0	0	Balance	1
Max	63	25	1	0.1	1	0.5	0.015	Balance	1.7

== Properties ==
Alloy 601 can also be identified by the UNS Number N06601. It shares similar properties to Alloy 600, but is more resistant to high-temperature oxidation due to the addition of aluminium. The combination of heat resistance and oxidation resistance means it is often used in the thermal processing industry for applications such as radiant tubes. It is also commonly used in high-temperature applications in the aerospace industry, such as gas turbine blades, combustion can-liners and jet engine igniters.
